Cryptocala acadiensis, the catocaline dart, is a species of cutworm or dart moth in the family Noctuidae. It lives in North America.

The MONA or Hodges number for Cryptocala acadiensis is 11012.

References

Further reading

 
 
 

Noctuinae
Articles created by Qbugbot
Moths described in 1870